Gülgəzli (also, Gyul’gezli) is a village and municipality in the Barda Rayon of Azerbaijan.  It has a population of 472.

References 

Populated places in Barda District